Markus Eriksson (born 29 November 1989) is a retired Swedish tennis player. Eriksson has a career high ATP singles ranking of 277, achieved on 19 August 2019.

Tennis career
Eriksson made his ATP main draw singles debut at the 2013 Swedish Open where he lost in the first round to Martín Alund. In 2014, he made his debut in the main draw of an ATP doubles event, when he and partner Isak Arvidsson received a wild card at the Swedish Open. They lost in the quarterfinals to the tournament third seeds, Tomasz Bednarek and Henri Kontinen.

In 2012, Eriksson was selected to represent the Swedish Davis Cup team in the World Group Playoffs against Belgium. For the period 2012 to 2020, he played in 14 Davis Cup ties winning 7 of the 16 singles matches and 4 of the 7 doubles matches that he played.

Eriksson won his first ATP Challenger title in the doubles, when he and his compatriot André Göransson won the title at the Tampere challenger, where they beat Ivan Gakhov and Alexander Pavlioutchenkov in the final.

ATP Challenger and ITF Futures titles

Singles: 10 
{|
|-valign=top
|

Doubles: 36 
{|
|-valign=top
|

References

External links
 
 
 

1989 births
Living people
Swedish male tennis players
Sportspeople from Gothenburg